Michigan's 3rd Senate district is one of 38 districts in the Michigan Senate. It has been represented by Democrat Stephanie Chang since 2023, succeeding fellow Democrat Sylvia Santana.

It is the most Democratic-leaning district in the Senate, giving both Hillary Clinton and Barack Obama over 80% of the vote.

Geography
District 3 encompasses parts of Macomb, Oakland, and Wayne counties.

2011 Apportionment Plan
District 3, as dictated by the 2011 Apportionment Plan, was based in the city of Dearborn and parts of western Detroit in Wayne County, also covering the smaller community of Melvindale.

The district overlapped with Michigan's 12th, 13th, and 14th congressional districts, and with the 5th, 7th, 8th, 9th, 10th, 14th, and 15th districts of the Michigan House of Representatives.

Recent election results

2018

2014

Federal and statewide results in District 3

Historical district boundaries

References 

3
Wayne County, Michigan